Siyabonga Cyprian Cwele (born 3 September 1958) is a South African doctor and politician, a long-serving member of the African National Congress. He has held various ministerial positions and served as the Minister of Home Affairs from 2018 to 2019.

Education
Cwele holds an MBChB Medical degree from the University of KwaZulu-Natal and an MPhil in Economic Policy from the University of Stellenbosch.

Career
He was previous the Minister of Telecommunications and Postal Services and previously served as the Minister of State Security (formerly named Minister of Intelligence Services).  He has been a member of the ANC Provincial Executive Committee in KwaZulu-Natal since 1990; a Member of Parliament since 1994 and Member of the National Assembly since 1999. He served as Chairperson of the Joint Standing Committee on Intelligence and prior to his appointment as Minister of State Security, he served as Minister of Intelligence from 2008 to 2009.

Marriage
Cwele married his wife Sheryl in 1985 but by 2000 the marriage was estranged. Arrested in 2010, she was convicted of dealing or conspiring to deal in drugs, and they divorced in 2011. They have four children together.

References

1957 births
Living people
Place of birth missing (living people)
Zulu people
African National Congress politicians
Government ministers of South Africa
Members of the National Assembly of South Africa
University of KwaZulu-Natal alumni
Stellenbosch University alumni
Ministers of Home Affairs of South Africa